Eduardo Antônio Machado Teixeira (born 7 June 1993), commonly known as Eduardo Teixeira, is a Brazilian professional footballer who plays as an attacking midfielder for Náutico, on loan from SC Braga.

Títulos
 Fluminense

 Primeira Liga do Brasil: 2016

 Náutico
 Campeonato Pernambucano: 2022

External links

1993 births
Living people
Association football midfielders
Brazilian footballers
Fortaleza Esporte Clube players
Fluminense FC players
Ceará Sporting Club players
Clube Náutico Capibaribe players
G.D. Estoril Praia players
S.C. Braga players
Xanthi F.C. players
Campeonato Brasileiro Série A players
Campeonato Brasileiro Série B players
Primeira Liga players
Super League Greece players
Brazilian expatriate footballers
Expatriate footballers in Portugal
Brazilian expatriate sportspeople in Portugal
Expatriate footballers in Greece
Brazilian expatriate sportspeople in Greece
Sportspeople from Fortaleza